Little Flower High School is a missionary educational institution based in Hyderabad, India. It teaches students, enrolled in lower Kindergarten up to 10th grade level.

History
Little Flower High School was established in July 1953 by the Montfort Brothers of St. Gabriel, whose founder was the 17th century French priest and Catholic saint, Saint Louis de Montfort. The school was set up under the guidance of Rev. Bro. John of God, with Rev. Bro. Britto as its first Principal, to mark the centenary celebrations of All Saints High School, Hyderabad. Initially, classes were conducted in temporary sheds for students in Kindergarten up to class 8 with two sections in each class. By 1957 there were classes till 10 with three sections each. The institution followed the HSLC course and later had the multi-purpose scheme from 1963 and came back to the SSC course.

LFHS was lauded as the best school in the twin cities and one of the ten best schools in India according to a survey conducted by the Outlook magazine (2001 - 2003) for two years consecutively. The school has also been ranked consistently among the ten best schools in India by a survey conducted by educationworldwideonline.net. The school was rated as the country's second best school for excellence in computer education by the Government of India and the award was received by Rev. Bro. Franky Noronha from the then president Dr. A.P.J. Abdul Kalam in an official ceremony. The school has alumni like V. V. S. Laxman, Arshad Ayub,  Speaker of the Telangana Legislative Assembly, Suresh Reddy, Mithin Aachi,Dr. Mohd. Faheemuddin,  Arvind Chenji, former Governor of Andhra Pradesh and Telangana E.S.L. Narasimhan  and Nandamuri Balakrishna.

In the academic year 2009-10, Outlook magazine ranked Little Flower High School as the best school in Hyderabad (Principal: Rev. Bro. Jaico Gervasis). In the same academic year, a student V. Sri Krishna secured the first place in the scholarship test held by HDFC bank and won a scholarship worth Rs.10,00,000. In 2010, two students won the Horlicks Quiz competition and one was Runner Up in the TCS IT Quiz.

In 2006, two students namely Rithvik Ramadas and Abhinav Ram were a part of the team 'Space Architects' that were runners up in the International Space Settlement Design Competition held at Johnsons Space Center, Houston, Texas. Their team stood first in the Asian Finals of 2006. In 2010, a team of twelve students won the Asian finals again. They were teamed up with Amity International School, Saket and Lahore Grammar School Main, Lahore and was mentored by Abhinav Ram.  Again in 2011, another team of twelve participated in the competition and were declared runners up. The school plans to take part in this competition again.

Admissions
Despite the fact that the school is a Catholic Minority Institution, admission is open to all students, regardless of caste, creed, religion, or gender. The school has a joint admission policy with St Paul's High School in Hyderabad and All Saints High School in Hyderabad, both of which are also run by the Montfort Brothers of St. Gabriel.

Each year in January, one of the three schools holds the Kindergarten admissions process. It entails a student and parent interview. The number of students who apply for admission far outnumbers the number of available positions, making it a highly competitive process. Students may select one of the three schools, but their selection is not guaranteed. Generally, a 20% quota is set aside for economically disadvantaged students.

Divisions
The school has four academic divisions- Pre-primary, Primary, Middle and Senior.

The pre-primary division has four sections each of lower and upper Kindergarten. The primary division has four sections each of Classes I to IV (Class IV is equivalent to the Fourth Grade as it is called in the USA, Canada and some other parts of the world. Note that the word "Class" is used instead of "Grade" and the year is written in Roman Numeral). The pre-primary and primary divisions are housed in one campus, commonly called the "Primary School".

Exams
The academic year is divided into three quarters, beginning in mid-June and ending in early April. Examinations are held at the end of each quarter and month.

At the end of Class 10, students take the State Government-administered Secondary School Certificate Examination.

Houses and section
Even though the school is not a residential school, it employs a House system. The student body is divided into four houses, with each student wearing their respective house's flaps.

 Aeronauts – Blue
 Argonauts – Red
 Astronauts – Yellow
 Cosmonauts – Green
 A SECTION
 B SECTION
 C SECTION
 D SECTION

School Ceremonies and Traditions
 Investiture Ceremony 
At the beginning of every academic year, the newly elected School Student Cabinet and class leaders, house leaders take the oath of office in a colourful yet solemn Investiture ceremony.  The School Pupil Leaders for Boys and Girls make their maiden speech on this occasion. The academic year 2010-11's Investiture Ceremony took place on 3 July 2010.
 Teachers' Day
September 5 of every year is celebrated as Teachers' Day all over India in the memory of former President Dr. Sarvepalli Radhakrishnan. In what is probably the most festive celebration of the year, students show their appreciation to their teachers. The event is organized by the students under the flagship of the School Cabinet. Events include an hour of Self Governance where the leaders of class and house from each section of the respective grade from the VII class are requested to go to their junior class and take classes instead of their teachers and a prize is awarded to the best "Student Teacher". The teachers are thanked with gifts brought with the funds collected by the students. Sporting and cultural competitions are organized and the teachers compete for prizes.
 Children's Day
Every year on November 14, the school celebrates Children's Day, which commemorates the birth of the first Prime Minister of Independent India, Pandit Jawarhar Lal Nehru, with fun-filled acts performed by the school's staff. Prizes are distributed to students who have won literary and cultural competitions held throughout the year.
Christmas Celebrations
Every year, by mid-December, Christmas celebrations are held in the school grounds, with students performing a play about the birth of Jesus Christ.
Republic Day
On January 26, the school celebrates Republic Day with flag hoisting and a march past drill by the House Leaders, Class Leaders, and the school cabinet, as well as the school's NCC contingent.
Montfort Literary, Cultural and Sports competitions
The Montfort Literary and Cultural Festival (also known as the Mo-Li-Cul Fest) and the Montfort Sports Festivals are held every alternate years. The competitions are held between all the Montfortian schools. Little Flower High School hosted MoLiCul 2008. The school performed well in the Montfort Literary and Cultural Competitions 2009 (also known as Montryst 2009) held at N.St.Mathew's Public School in Vijayawada.

2016 Achievements 
The British Council presented the school with the International School Award.

A total of 14 students from the school won the Space Settlement Design Competition. They travelled to Florida to visit the Kennedy Space Center.

Master Mohd. Hashmi and Hussain Ahmed won TCS IT WIZ at the city level.

MoLiCul Fest 2008
The MoLiCul Fest 2008 saw participation from over 14 schools belonging to the Pune and Hyderabad provinces. LFHS hosted the 15th edition of the Montfort Competitions after a 14-year gap. There were changes made in the format of the Literary events and a new events were added to the Cultural Category. The Literary events were challenging as students had to be selected for final rounds on the basis of performance, and in the finals they had to perform extempore.

Events like Mime and Origami were made part of the Cultural Events. The MoLiCul Fest also witnessed an Opening Ceremony and a Valedictory Ceremony. The highlights of both the programmes were fusion dances accompanied by a live orchestra (members of the LFHS school choir.) The main attractions of the MoLiCul Fest were the MoLiCul Jyoti, the MoLiCul Ship and most importantly the grid-portrait of St.Louis de Montfort which was prepared by the students of LFHS under the guidance of their Principal.

LFHS won the Literary, Cultural and Overall Trophies on the basis of overall performance.

Little Flower School, emerge Hyderabad  "City Champions" in vodafone third edition of its annual ‘faster, smarter, better’ inter-school quiz

Facilities
Infrastructure
 Library – High School Campus
 Library – Primary School Campus
 Two auditoriums
 Science Laboratories
 Computer Laboratories
 Auditorium
 Dining hall (boys and girls)
 Digital Library – High School Campus

Sports facilities
 Basketball court
 Table tennis rooms
 Badminton courts (indoor)
 Gymnasium
 Cricket
 Volleyball

Clubs
Subject clubs
Ecology and Environmental club
HAM or Amateur radio
Interact club for social service
NIE
NCC
Dance
Music
Dramatics
Drawing
Robotics
Scouts and guides

See also
Education in India
List of schools in India

References

Brothers of Christian Instruction of St Gabriel schools
Catholic schools in India
Christian schools in Telangana
High schools and secondary schools in Hyderabad, India
Educational institutions established in 1953
1953 establishments in India